Oscar F. Thieme (May 28, 1869 – 1926) was an American businessman and politician from Milwaukee, Wisconsin.  He served one term as a member of the Wisconsin State Assembly.

Biography

Oscar Thieme was born in Milwaukee, Wisconsin.  He was educated and lived most of his life there.  He worked in real estate and insurance, and, for a time, was employed as a clerk for Milwaukee County judges Emil Wallber, James M. Pereles, and John E. Mann.  He was elected to the Assembly as a Republican, representing Milwaukee County's 8th district (the 9th ward of the city of Milwaukee) in a three-way race, defeating Democrat David Geraghty and Social Democrat William Baumann.

He died in 1926 and was buried at Milwaukee's Forest Home Cemetery.

References

External links

Politicians from Milwaukee
Republican Party members of the Wisconsin State Assembly
1869 births
1926 deaths
Burials in Wisconsin